The 1937 European Rowing Championships were rowing championships for men held on the Bosbaan in the Dutch city of Amsterdam. The construction of the Bosbaan was an unemployment project, with the forest planted from 1934 onwards and the rowing lake finished in 1936. The rowers competed in all seven Olympic boat classes (M1x, M2x, M2-, M2+, M4-, M4+, M8+).

Medal summary

In the coxless four, the Swiss team looked like the certain winners. At 1,900, with one and a half lengths of lead, the boat was hit by a wave that had been reflected from the bulkhead, Hermann Betschart had his oar ripped out of his hands but not before the rowlock bent and the hull was ripped open. The Swiss came second to a standing ovation, having been overtaken by the German boat.

References

European Rowing Championships
Rowing competitions in the Netherlands
Rowing
Sports competitions in Amsterdam
European Rowing Championships
Rowing
European Rowing Championships